Brucella rhizosphaerae is a gram-negative,  oxidase-positive bacteria from the genus of Brucella which was isolated from rhizosphere from a potato in Austria.

References

External links
Type strain of Ochrobactrum rhizosphaerae at BacDive -  the Bacterial Diversity Metadatabase

 

Hyphomicrobiales
Bacteria described in 2008